Skeffling is a village and civil parish in the East Riding of Yorkshire, England, in an area known as Holderness.

According to the 2011 UK census, Skeffling parish had a population of 149, a decrease on the 2001 UK census figure of 153.

The parish church of St Helen is a Grade I listed building that is situated to the south of the village. It is constructed of cobble with stone dressings and was built in the 1460s.

Skeffling projects 
Among developments in Skefling has been the installation, by Eagle Power, of a 6 kW wind turbine on a free standing  mast. This was made possible with help from the BERR's  Low Carbon Buildings Program, Langeled's Rural Communities Development Fund, DEFRA, Yorkshire Forward, Humber & Wolds Rural Community Council and with vital help and guidance from Karen Wood, the rural communities' officer from East Riding of Yorkshire Council.

The turbine was installed on 20 February 2007 and powers Skeffling Village Hall, with any excess is sold to the National Grid; the proceeds are used to help maintain and eventually replace the turbine. The decision to use renewable energy was made with long term sustainability in mind.

References

External links

Skeffling projects since 2004

Villages in the East Riding of Yorkshire
Holderness
Civil parishes in the East Riding of Yorkshire